Paul Segre is an American businessman who was named CEO of Synamedia on October 23, 2020. He was previously best known as the CEO of Genesys in Daly City, California. Segre received a bachelor's degree in the mathematical sciences and a master's degree in Operations Research from Stanford University in 1983.

In 2002, Segre was named chief technology officer of Genesys. He later became the company's chief operating officer. In October 2007, Segre replaced Wes Hayden as president and CEO of Genesys. From 2007–2012, Segre was the president of the Applications Group at Alcatel-Lucent. Before joining Genesys, Segre worked with DSC (Digital Switch Corporation), AT&T Network Systems and Bell Labs.

In 2014, Segre was recognized as a finalist for the Ernst & Young's Entrepreneur of the Year Award.

In 2018, Segre was named one of Glassdoor's Top 25 CEOs in Canada.  He was ranked 14 with a 96% approval rating from employees.

Further reading
Paul Segre on CNBC Arabia

References

Stanford University alumni
Living people
American chief operating officers
American chief technology officers
American technology chief executives
Year of birth missing (living people)